Political forecasting aims at forecasting the outcomes of political events. Political events can be a number of events such as diplomatic decisions, actions by political leaders and other areas relating to politicians and political institutions. The area of political forecasting concerning elections is highly popular, especially amongst mass market audiences. Political forecasting methodology makes frequent use of mathematics, statistics and data science. Political forecasting as it pertains to elections is related to psephology.

History of Election Forecasting 
People have long been interested in predicting election outcomes. Quotes of betting odds on papal succession appear as early as 1503, when such wagering was already considered "an old practice." Political betting also has a long history in Great Britain. As one prominent example, Charles James Fox, the late-eighteenth-century Whig statesman, was known as an inveterate gambler. His biographer, George Otto Trevelyan, noted that"(f)or ten years, from 1771 onwards, Charles Fox betted frequently, largely, and judiciously, on the social and political occurrences of the time."

Before the advent of scientific polling in 1936, betting odds in the United States correlated strongly to vote results.  Since 1936, opinion polls have been a basic part of political forecasting. More recently, prediction markets have been formed, starting in 1988 with Iowa Electronic Markets.

With the advent of statistical techniques, electoral data have become increasingly easy to handle. It is no surprise, then, that election forecasting has become a big business, for polling firms, news organizations, and betting markets as well as academic students of politics.

Academic scholars have constructed models of voting behavior to forecast the outcomes of elections. These forecasts are derived from theories and empirical evidence about what matters to voters when they make electoral choices. The forecast models typically rely on a few predictors in highly aggregated form, with an emphasis on phenomena that change in the short-run, such as the state of the economy, so as to offer maximum leverage for predicting the result of a specific election.

An early successful model which is still being used is The Keys to the White House by Allan Lichtman. Election forecasting in the United States was first brought to the attention of the wider public by Nate Silver and his FiveThirtyEight website in 2008. Currently, there are many competing models trying to predict the outcome of elections in the United States, the United Kingdom, and elsewhere.

In a national or state election, macroeconomic conditions, such as employment, new job creation, the interest rate, and the inflation rate are also considered.

Methods of Election Forecasting

Averaging polls

Combining poll data lowers the forecasting mistakes of a poll.  Political forecasting models include averaged poll results, such as the RealClearPolitics poll average.

Poll damping

Poll damping is when incorrect indicators of public opinion are not used in a forecast model. For instance, early in the campaign, polls are poor measures of the future choices of voters. The poll results closer to an election are a more accurate prediction.  Campbell shows the power of poll damping in political forecasting.

Regression Models
Political scientists and economists oftentimes use regression models of past elections. This is done to help forecast the votes of the political parties – for example, Democrats and Republicans in the US. The information helps their party's next presidential candidate forecast the future. Most models include at least one public opinion variable, a trial heat poll, or a presidential approval rating.
Bayesian statistics can also be used to estimate the posterior distributions of the true proportion of voters that will vote for each candidate in each state, given both the polling data available and the previous election results for each state.  Each poll can be weighted based on its age and its size, providing a highly dynamic forecasting mechanism as Election day approaches.   http://electionanalytics.cs.illinois.edu/ is an example of a site that employs such methods.

Nomenclature

When discussing the likelihood of a particular electoral outcome, political forecasters tend to use one of a small range of shorthand phrases.  These include:

Solid (e.g., "Solid Republican"), also Safe.  Very unlikely that the party which currently holds the seat will change in the upcoming election.
Likely (e.g., "Likely Democratic"), also Favored.  It is not thought at the moment that the seat will be particularly competitive, and hence the party is likely to remain unchanged, but there is a possibility this may alter.
Lean (e.g., "Leans Independent"). One candidate / party has a slight advantage in polling and forecasting, but other outcomes are possible.
Tilt.  Used less widely than the other terms, but indicates a very small advantage to one or another party.
Toss-Up. These are the seats that are considered to be the most competitive, with more than one party having a good chance of winning.

Markets for Election Forecasting 
Forecasting can involve skin-in-the-game crowdsourcing via prediction markets on the theory that people more honestly evaluate and express their true perception with money at stake. However, individuals with a large economic or ego investment in the outcome of a future election may be willing to sacrifice economic gain in order to alter public perception of the likely outcome of an election prior to election day—a positive perception of a favoured candidate is widely depicted as helping to "energize" voter turnout in support of that candidate when voting begins. When the prognosis derived from the election market itself becomes instrumental in determining voter turnout or voter preference leading up to an election, the valuation derived from the market becomes less reliable as a mechanism of political forecasting.

Prediction markets show very accurate forecasts of an election outcome. One example is the Iowa Electronic Markets. In a study, 964 election polls were compared with the five US presidential elections from 1988 to 2004. Berg et al. (2008) showed that the Iowa Electronic Markets topped the polls 74% of the time. However, damped polls have been shown to top prediction markets. Comparing damped polls to forecasts of the Iowa Electronic Markets, Erikson and Wlezien (2008) showed that the damped polls outperform all markets or models.

Impact of Election Forecasting 
According to a 2020 study, election forecasting "increases [voters'] certainty about an election's outcome, confuses many, and decreases turnout. Furthermore, we show that election forecasting has become prominent in the media, particularly in outlets with liberal audiences, and show that such coverage tends to more strongly affect the candidate who is ahead."

Other Types of Forecasting Models 
Other types of forecasting include forecasting models designed to predict the outcomes of international relations or bargaining events. One notable example is the expected utility model developed by American political scientist Bruce Bueno de Mesquita, which solves for the Bayesian Perfect Equilibria outcome of unidimensional policy events, with numerous applications including international conflict and diplomacy. Various implementations of political science forecasting tools have become increasingly common in political science, and numerous other Bayesian models exist with their components increasingly detailed in scientific literature. Ranked voting requires polling ranked preferences to predict winners.

See also 
Psephology

 British Polling Council
 Electoral Calculus
 Electoral geography
 Larry Sabato
 Political analyst
 Political data scientists
 PollyVote
 Psephologist
 Swing (politics)
 Types of democracy

References 

Brown, P.J., Firth, D.,  & C. D. Payne, C.D. (1999). Forecasting on British election night 1997, Journal of the Royal Statistical Society: Series A, 162 (2), 211–226.

Statistical forecasting
Political science
Survey methodology
Regression with time series structure